Maltitol is a sugar alcohol (a polyol) used as a sugar substitute. It has 75–90% of the sweetness of sucrose (table sugar) and nearly identical properties, except for browning. It is used to replace table sugar because it is half as energetic, does not promote tooth decay, and has a somewhat lesser effect on blood glucose.  In chemical terms, maltitol is known as 4-O-α-glucopyranosyl--sorbitol. It is used in commercial products under trade names such as Lesys, Maltisweet and SweetPearl.

Production and uses

Maltitol is a disaccharide produced by hydrogenation of maltose obtained from starch. Maltitol syrup, a hydrogenated starch hydrolysate, is created by hydrogenating corn syrup, a mixture of carbohydrates produced from the hydrolysis of starch. This product contains between 50% and 80% maltitol by weight. The remainder is mostly sorbitol, with a small quantity of other sugar-related substances.

Maltitol's high sweetness allows it to be used without being mixed with other sweeteners. It exhibits a negligible cooling effect (positive heat of solution) in comparison with other sugar alcohols, and is very similar to the subtle cooling effect of sucrose.
It is used in candy manufacture, particularly sugar-free hard candy, chewing gum, chocolates, baked goods, and ice cream. The pharmaceutical industry uses maltitol as an excipient, where it is used as a low-calorie sweetening agent. Its similarity to sucrose allows it to be used in syrups with the advantage that crystallization (which may cause bottle caps to stick) is less likely. Maltitol may also be used as a plasticizer in gelatin capsules, as an emollient, and as a humectant.

Nutritional information
Maltitol provides between 2 and 3 kcal/g. Maltitol is largely unaffected by human digestive enzymes and is fermented by bacteria in the large intestine, with about 15% of the ingested maltitol appearing unchanged in the feces.

Chemical properties
Maltitol in its crystallized form measures the same (bulk) as table sugar and browns and caramelizes in a manner very similar to that of sucrose after liquifying by exposure to intense heat. The crystallized form is readily dissolved in warm liquids (120 °F / 48.9 °C and above); the powdered form is preferred if room-temperature or cold liquids are used.  Due to its sucrose-like structure, maltitol is easy to produce and made commercially available in crystallized, powdered, and syrup forms.

It is not metabolized by oral bacteria, so it does not promote tooth decay. It is somewhat more slowly absorbed than sucrose, which makes it somewhat more suitable for people with diabetes than sucrose. Its food energy value is 2.1 kcal/g (8.8 kJ/g); (sucrose is 3.9 kcal/g (16.2 kJ/g)).

Effects on digestion
Like other sugar alcohols (with the possible exception of erythritol), maltitol has a laxative effect, typically causing diarrhea at a daily consumption above about 90 g. Doses of about 40 g may cause mild borborygmus (stomach and bowel sounds) and flatulence.

See also
 Isomalt
 Maltisorb
 Laxative

References

External links

Maltitol, Calorie Control Council

E-number additives
Excipients
Glycosides
Starch
Sugar alcohols
Sugar substitutes